Neolithodes bronwynae, commonly known as the rock crab, is a species of king crab which is found at the Whakatane Seamount in the Bay of Plenty, the Lord Howe Rise near Lord Howe Island, and possibly New Caledonia. It has long spines and a deep-red colour.

Etymology 
"Neolithodes" is derived from Greek and Latin and means "new stone-crab", while "bronwynae" is named for Bronwyn Ahyong.

See also 
 List of crabs of New Zealand

References

External links 
 
 Images of a N. bronwynae specimen at Museums Victoria

King crabs
Crustaceans described in 2010
Marine crustaceans of New Zealand
Taxa named by Shane T. Ahyong